Tha Tha Thabungton is a traditional Meitei language lullaby.
It is one of the Meitei folk songs traditionally sung by parents, usually mothers. It has reference to the aspects of bringing up their child, besides their biological relationship with their child. It also has reference to the musical harmony with the care of the child, which may also influence on the child's life and health.

In Meitei society, mothers usually carry their children on their backs or shoulders and sing the "Tha Tha Thabungton" cradle song, giving reference to the "Thaa" and the "Heibong".

Etymology 
According to the opinion of some writers, "thabungton" is the shortened form of "tha mapung maton" (morphologically, "moon-full-top", literally meaning "full moon").

Lyrics 

The Meitei language term "Morambi" is translated as "darling child" in the publication of the "Oriental Institute of Cultural and Social Research". On the other hand, the same term "Morambi" is defined as "a figure of baby, usu made of cloth" in a publication of the University of Chicago.

In popular culture 
 The lullaby "Tha, Tha Thabungton" was featured in the 1972 Meitei language feature film Matamgi Manipur.
 The lullaby "Tha Tha Thabungton..." was featured in a theatrical production named "Heyang Athouba" as a part of the "Rhythm of Manipur's 3rd Opera Production" organized at the JN Manipur Dance Akademi, Imphal on the 28th of July 2013.

Similar lullabies 
 Der Mond ist aufgegangen - a German language lullaby
 Northeastern Cradle Song - a Chinese language lullaby

See also 
 Lairembigee Eshei
 Shakuhachi meets Pena
 Nura Pakhang (Eu e Tu)

Notes

References

External links 

 Tha Tha Thabungton at 

Lullabies
Fiction set on the Moon
Ficus
Meitei folklore
Meitei folklore in popular culture
Meitei-language songs
Meitei literature
Moon in art
Moon myths
Motherhood
Parenting
Plants in culture
Songs about outer space
Songs about plants
Songs about trees
Songs about the Moon
Trees in culture
Works about the Moon
Works about trees